Rincón de Romos is a municipality and city in the Mexican state of Aguascalientes.

As of 2010, the city had a total population of 27,988.

Most of the inhabitants of Rincón de Romos are Catholic. Rincón de Romos celebrates a "Fiesta" to the Señor de las Angustias on January with dances and pyrotechnic games. There is a church to him downtown. Most of the locals work as teachers. The city was once home to a priest named Padre Nieves who people believed made miracles. He has a church in the city, and many people go to Rincón de Romos to pray for miracles. Rincón de Romos has the biggest rural hospital ruled by the government of Aguascalientes.

Rincón de Romos is a town located in the central-northern region of Aguascalientes, Mexico. In 1639, the Real Audiencia of Guadalajara authorized the creation of a little town, which became known throughout time as Chora. In 1658, Captain Diego Romo de Vivar y Pérez, a member of a noble family belonging to the House of Vivar, bought the majority of the land of Hacienda de Rincón from Don Pedro Rincon of Arteaga. This deal combined both names and changed the town name of Chora to Rincón de Romos. Its coordinates are 102°19’ E longitude, and 22°14’ N latitude, with an altitude of 1,940 meters above sea level.

Rincón de Romos borders the municipality of Cosío on the north, Pabellón de Arteaga to the south, Tepezalá on the east and San Jose de Gracia on the west. It is divided into 64 towns, of which the most important are the municipal capitals: Rincón de Romos, the town of Pabellón de Hidalgo, Pablo Escaleras, San Jacinto and El Bajio. It makes up a surface area of 372.93 square meters, representing 6.7% of the state's territory. Rincón de Romos is part of the province of the Sierra Madre Occidental. In the province of the Mesa Central are semi-flat zones in the center and northeastern parts of the city, as well as flat areas in the center and northeast between the Fria and Loreto mountains.

Climate
Rincón de Romos has a dry climate, with an average temperature of 18° Celsius in the hottest months of May and August. Its annual precipitation is approximately 400 millimeters. The wind generally moves from north to southeast in the summer and part of fall.

Demographics

As of 2010, the municipality had a total population of 49,156.

As of 2010, the city of Rincón de Romos had a population of 27,988. Other than the city of Rincón de Romos, the municipality had 355 localities, the largest of which (with 2010 populations in parentheses) were: Pabellón de Hidalgo (4,316), Escaleras (2,790), classified as urban, and San Jacinto (2,356), and El Bajío (1,278), classified as rural.

Religion
In 2000, according to the census done by Inegi, the population of Catholics 5 years and older rose to 76,789, while the non-Catholics in the same age range totaled 5,079 people.

Economy
The Panamerican Highway plays an important role in trade. There are also mercury mines and copper, which are exploding industries.

Agriculture
Thanks to irrigation, agriculture is big. Maize, Beans, Garlic, Potatoes, Chile, as well as peaches, pears and grapes are grown.

Services
Rincón de Romos has medical services, gas stations, restaurants, tourist centers, a train station, a bus station, a repair shop, taxis, telephone, mail, and auto services, as well as shopping. It also has its own university and high school.

References

Link to tables of population data from Census of 2005 Instituto Nacional de Estadística, Geografía e Informática (INEGI)
Aguascalientes Enciclopedia de los Municipios de México

External links
Gobierno de Rincón de Romos Official website
https://web.archive.org/web/20070406171651/http://www.aguascalientes.gob.mx/ Gobierno del Estado de Aguascalientes] Official website of State of Aguascalientes

Populated places in Aguascalientes